Donald Hayworth (January 13, 1898 – February 25, 1982) was a politician from the U.S. state of Michigan.

Hayworth was born in Toledo, Iowa, and attended a country school in Mahaska County, Iowa, and high school in New Sharon, Iowa. He graduated from Grinnell College in 1918. During the First World War, he served as a private in the United States Army. He earned an M.A. from the University of Chicago in 1921 and a Ph.D. from the University of Wisconsin–Madison in 1929. He worked as a teacher in Oskaloosa High School in Oskaloosa, Iowa, 1921–1923 and was a professor at Penn College in Oskaloosa, 1923-1927. He then became a professor at the University of Akron in Akron, Ohio, 1928–1937, and at Michigan State College in East Lansing, Michigan, 1937-1963. He was in charge of the speakers' bureau at the Office of Civil Defense in Washington, D.C., in 1942 and 1943 and in charge of relations with the States on fuel conservation for the Department of the Interior, 1944-1946. He was the owner of the Plastics Manufacturing Co., 1950–1963

In 1952, Hayworth was an unsuccessful candidate of the Democratic Party for election to the 83rd United States Congress from Michigan's 6th congressional district, losing to Republican Kit F. Clardy. In 1954, Hayworth defeated the incumbent Clardy for election to the 84th Congress, serving from January 3, 1955 to January 3, 1957. He was an unsuccessful candidate for reelection in 1956, losing in the general election to Republican Charles E. Chamberlain. He was the Democratic Party candidate in 1958 and 1962, losing both times to Chamberlain.

Hayworth became a consultant, with the Department of Agriculture, 1963–1964, and with the Social Security Administration, 1965-1967. He was a member of Americans for Democratic Action and was a resident of Washington, D.C., until his death there.  Hayworth's body was donated to the George Washington University School of Medicine & Health Sciences.

References

Sources

Donald Hayworth at The Political Graveyard

1898 births
1982 deaths
University of Chicago alumni
University of Wisconsin–Madison alumni
Grinnell College alumni
University of Akron faculty
Michigan State University faculty
William Penn University faculty
Democratic Party members of the United States House of Representatives from Michigan
People from Toledo, Iowa
People from Oskaloosa, Iowa
People from Mahaska County, Iowa
20th-century American politicians